The 2021–22 East Tennessee State Buccaneers men's basketball team represented East Tennessee State University in the 2021–22 NCAA Division I men's basketball season. The Buccaneers, led by first-year head coach Desmond Oliver, played their home games at the Freedom Hall Civic Center in Johnson City, Tennessee, as members of the Southern Conference. They finished the season 15–17, 7–11 in SoCon play to finish in eighth place. They lost to The Citadel in the first round of the SoCon tournament.

Previous season
In a season limited due to the ongoing COVID-19 pandemic, the Buccaneers finished the 2020–21 season 13–12 overall, 8–7 in SoCon play to finish in fifth place. In the SoCon tournament, they defeated Chattanooga in the quarterfinals, before losing to UNC Greensboro in the semifinals.

On March 30, 2021, Jason Shay resigned after one season as head coach following his support of his players kneeling during the national anthem as protest of social injustice. He joined former ETSU head coach Steve Forbes as an assistant coach at Wake Forest. On April 5, the school named Tennessee assistant coach Desmond Oliver as the team's new head coach.

Roster

Schedule and results

|-
!colspan=12 style=| Exhibition

|-
!colspan=12 style=| Non-conference Regular season

|-
!colspan=12 style=| SoCon Regular season

|-
!colspan=12 style=| SoCon tournament
|-

Source

References 

East Tennessee State Buccaneers men's basketball seasons
East Tennessee State
East Tennessee State Buccaneers men's basketball
East Tennessee State Buccaneers men's basketball